The 1824 St. Petersburg Flood occurred in 1824 killing several hundred people. It was the deadliest flood in the history of Russia and St. Petersburg. The water level peaked at 421 centimetres at 14:00 (2 PM), the highest recorded floodwaters in Russian history.

References 

Floods in Russia
1824 floods in Europe